Bob Curtis also known as Robert Leroy Curtis (September 1, 1925,. Leflore county, Mississippi – December 9, 2009 Vienna, Austria) was a dancer and choreographer of modern dance. From the late 1960s onwards, he became one of the most important representatives of the form of contemporary dance in Europe, which was shaped by African dance.

Curtis was photographed by Carl Van Vechten on April 19, 1955.

He is buried at the Vienna Central Cemetery.

References 

People from Mississippi
1925 births
2009 deaths